International Conference on Computer and Information Technology or ICCIT is a series of computer science and information technology based conferences that is hosted in Bangladesh since 1997 by a different university each year. ICCIT provides a forum for researchers, scientists, and professionals from both academia and industry to exchange up-to-date knowledge and experience in different fields of computer science/engineering and information and communication technology (ICT). This is a regularly held ICT based major annual conference (held typically in December) in Bangladesh now in its 25th year. ICCIT series has succeeded in engaging the most number of universities in Bangladesh from both public and private sectors. Each new university in Bangladesh have been investing in computer science, computer engineering, information systems, and related fields.

Starting 2008, the ICCIT is co-sponsored by IEEE. On average, since 2003, 31.1% manuscripts submitted are accepted for presentation and inclusion in the IEEE Xplore Digital Library, one of the largest scholarly research database containing over two million records that indexes, abstracts, and provides full-text for articles and papers on computer science, electrical engineering, electronics, information technology, and physical sciences.

History
ICCIT trace its history to 1997 when University of Dhaka organized a conference, National Conference on Computer and Information Systems (NCCIS) based on IT and Computer Science. Probably it was the first initiative to organize an IT based conference in Bangladesh with participation from multiple universities. Very next year in 1998, this conference was renamed to its current name and gained international status by opening its door to the participants from outside of Bangladesh. Since then each year a university approved by the ICCIT committee hosts this event during late December.

Areas
ICCIT is mainly focused on computer science and information technology but also covers related electronic engineering topics. Major areas of ICCIT include, but not limited to:

 Algorithms
 Artificial intelligence
 Bengali language processing
 Bio-informatics
 Computer vision
 Computer graphics and multimedia
 Computer network and data communications
 Computer based education
 Database systems
 Digital signal processing and image processing
 Digital system and logic design
 Distributed and parallel processing
 E-commerce and E-governance
 Human computer interaction
 Information systems
 Internet and World Wide Web Applications
 Knowledge data engineering
 Neural networks
 Pattern recognition
 Robotics
 Software engineering
 System security
 Ubiquitous computing
 VLSI
 Wireless communications and mobile computing

Past conferences
Starting 1997, ICCIT has had 24 successful events at 20 different universities.

 1997 University of Dhaka, Dhaka (as NCCIS '97)
 1998 Bangladesh University of Engineering and Technology (BUET), Dhaka
 1999 Shahjalal University of Science and Technology, Sylhet
 2000 North South University, Dhaka
 2001 University of Dhaka, Dhaka
 2002 East West University, Dhaka
 2003 Jahangirnagar University, Savar
 2004 BRAC University, Dhaka
 2005 Islamic University of Technology (IUT), Gazipur
 2006 Independent University Bangladesh (IUB), Dhaka
 2007 United International University (UIU), Dhaka
 2008 Khulna University of Engineering and Technology (KUET), Khulna
 2009 Independent University Bangladesh (IUB) and Military Institute of Science and Technology, Dhaka
 2010 Ahsanullah University of Science and Technology, Dhaka
 2011 American International University-Bangladesh, Dhaka
 2012 Chittagong University, Chittagong
 2013 Khulna University, Khulna
 2014 Daffodil International University, Dhaka
 2015 Military Institute of Science and Technology, Dhaka
 2016 North South University, Dhaka
 2017 University of Asia Pacific, Dhaka
 2018 United International University, Dhaka
 2019 Southeast University, Dhaka
 2020 Ahsanullah University of Science and Technology, Dhaka
 2021 North South University, Dhaka

International Program Committee

The key to the success of ICCIT is its International Program Committee (IPC), co-chaired by Professor Mohammad Ataul Karim, of University of Massachusetts Dartmouth and Professor Mohammad Showkat Alam of Texas A&M University-Kingsville. The IPC for ICCIT 2012, for example, is a body of eighty five (85) field experts all of whom are affiliated with either a university or a research organisation from outside of Bangladesh. The national make-up of the latest IPC is as follows: USA (43), Australia (12), Canada(6), UK (5), Malaysia (4), Japan (3), Germany (2), India (2), Korea (2), New Zealand (2), Belgium (1), China (1), Ireland (1), Norway (1), and Switzerland (1).

Journal special issues

Starting with ICCIT 2008, a selected number of manuscripts after further enhancement and extensive review process are being included in one of several journal special issues. ICCIT doesn't end with just conference proceedings but with those that are indexed worldwide and takes many of its better papers to its next logical level to the journals. To date, 14 journal special issues have been produced by ICCIT IPC featuring works of  Bangladesh-based researchers in the fields of communications, computing, multimedia, networks, and software. This is a serious feat for Bangladesh its many researchers; the outcome from this single conference is allowing for about 30–35 team of researchers each year to be able to showcase their research through archival and indexed journals that really matter. It is a major scholarly milestone which makes ICCIT series different from all other technical conferences held in Bangladesh. In its latest iteration, 32 selected enhanced ICCIT 2011 manuscripts after having gone through extensive reviews have been accepted now for inclusion in the following international journals.
  
Journal of Communications
Guest Editors: M.N. Islam, SUNY Farmingdale, US; K.M. Iftekharuddin, Old Dominion University, US; M.A. Karim, Old Dominion University, US; M.A. Salam, Southern University & A&M College, Louisiana, US

Journal of Computers
Guest Editors: S.M. Aziz, University of South Australia, Australia; M.S. Alam, University of South Alabama, US; K.V. Asari, University of Dayton, US; M. Alamgir Hossain, University of Northumbria, UK; M.A. Karim, Old Dominion University, US; M. Milanova, University of Arkansas at Little Rock, US

Journal of Multimedia
Guest Editors: M. Murshed, Monash University, Australia; M.A. Karim, Old Dominion University, US; M. Paul, Monash University, Australia; S. Zhang, College of Staten Island, US

Journal of Networks
Guest Editors: S. Jabir, France Telecom, Japan; J. Abawajy, Deakin University, Australia; F. Ahmed, Johns Hopkins University Applied Physics Laboratory, US; M.A. Karim, Old Dominion University, US; J. Kamruzzaman, Monash University, Australia; Nurul I. Sarkar, Auckland University of Technology, New Zealand

References

External links
 11th ICCIT Home page
 15th ICCIT Home page

Computer science conferences
Information technology in Bangladesh